Otto Jensen (1 January 1893 – 25 December 1972) was a Danish cyclist. He competed in two events at the 1912 Summer Olympics.

References

External links
 

1893 births
1972 deaths
Danish male cyclists
Olympic cyclists of Denmark
Cyclists at the 1912 Summer Olympics
People from Herning Municipality
Sportspeople from the Central Denmark Region